74 Cygni is a visual binary star system in the northern constellation Cygnus, located around 249 light years distant from the Sun. It is visible to the naked eye as a faint, white-hued star with a combined apparent visual magnitude of 5.04. The system is a source of X-ray emission, which is most likely coming from the secondary component.

The primary component is an A-type main-sequence star with a stellar classification of A3 Vn; a star that is fusing its core hydrogen. The 'n' suffix indicates "nebulous" absorption lines due to rapid rotation, with the star having a projected rotational velocity of 201 km/s. The high rate of spin is giving the star an oblate shape with an equatorial bulge that is 8% larger than the polar radius. The star has 1.68 times the mass of the Sun and is radiating 36 times the Sun's luminosity from its photosphere at an effective temperature of about 7,859 K.

References

A-type main-sequence stars
Binary stars
Cygnus (constellation)
Durchmusterung objects
Cygni, 74
205835
106711
8266